The Passionate Eye is a Canadian documentary television series—and online playlist—that showcases documentary programming from around the world focusing on topics of news, current affairs, politics, and social issues. Airing on CBC News Network, it has been on-air since 1992, and has had a website since 2002.

The program was originally hosted by Michaëlle Jean, who left the position when she was appointed the new Governor General of Canada effective September 27, 2005. Jean was not immediately replaced by a permanent host; the series continued under a hostless format until 2015, when Wendy Mesley finally took the reins as a permanent host.

The series initially aired on Sunday and Monday nights. Debuting documentaries, the Sunday programme was titled The Passionate Eye Sunday Showcase (or, The Passionate Eye - Sunday); whereas the Monday-night feature was titled The Passionate Eye - Monday. The series eventually dropped the "Sunday" and "Monday" from its heading when it began to air episodes more regularly into its third decade. The show formerly also aired on CBC Television's main network, but was replaced by Doc Zone and later Firsthand. The Passionate Eye continues to air on CBC News Network several times a week.

Going into 2021, CBC made various changes to its documentary commissioning operations; moving forward, the corporation will now commission and acquire one-hour documentaries under its The Passionate Eye banner. Also under this new strategy, documentaries that were previously commissioned under CBC Docs POV will be commissioned for CBC Television and CBC Gem under the Passionate Eye brand.

Similar documentary services of CBC's include: The Nature of Things, which commissions one-hour science and nature documentaries; documentary Channel, which commissions feature-length documentaries; and CBC Short Docs, which greenlights shorter-form documentaries and digital shorts.

Select episodes

Foreign-produced documentaries 
International documentaries showcased on The Passionate Eye include:

 Crumb — a profile of the satirical cartoonist Robert Crumb
 The Celluloid Closet — an investigation of Hollywood's treatment of homosexuals
 The Dying Rooms — an expose of the Chinese orphanages
 Russian Striptease — a stylistic look at sex and corruption in post-Perestroika Russia
 The Battle Over Citizen Kane — the impact of Citizen Kane between Orson Welles and William Randolph Hearst.
 Calling the Ghosts: A Story about Rape, War and Women — the personal journey of two Bosnian women, a lawyer and a judge, who were imprisoned during the civil war.
 In the Shadow of the Stars — behind-the-scenes look at the San Francisco Opera Company.
 For Better or For Worse (1993) — intimate portraits of five culturally-diverse couples who have been together for 50 years or longer.
 Fourteen Days in May — the last two weeks on death row with a man many believe to be innocent.
 Project Nim — the story of Nim Chimpsky, a chimpanzee who was the focus of a controversial experiment that aimed to show what would happen if baby chimps were taken from their mothers at birth and raised like humans.
 10%: What Makes a Hero? — an investigation into why some people are willing to put themselves at risk in order to perform what others consider heroic deeds
 The Choice 2020: Trump vs. Biden — investigative biographies of then-President Donald Trump and former Vice President Joe Biden.

References

External links
Official website

CBC Television original programming
2000s Canadian documentary television series
2010s Canadian documentary television series
Canadian Screen Award-winning television shows
CBC News Network original programming
1992 Canadian television series debuts
1990s Canadian television news shows
2000s Canadian television news shows
2010s Canadian television news shows
2020s Canadian television news shows
2020s Canadian documentary television series